Tribal Mobilization Or Tribal Fighters is an Iraqi Sunni tribal group made up of the sons of the tribes to fight ISIS. There is another group sometimes called the Tribal Mobilization, but its former name is the National Mobilization Forces (now the Nineveh Guards) linked to Atheel al-Nujaifi.

In 2017, the deputy head of the tribal mobilization, Thamer Al-Tamimi, said in an interview with Al-Hiwar satellite channel that Sunni leaders in Iraq have given up on the Arab states and have concluded that relying on these countries will not help the Sunnis in Iraq, especially since some of these countries use the Sunnis in Iraq as a tool in Its struggle for influence in the region with Iran, he confirmed that the tribal mobilization had contacted a number of Gulf countries to request support and support in confronting ISIS, but they did not respond and did not pay the slightest attention, as he put it.

US bombing allegations 
In October 2016, Iraqi officials announced the killing of 21 Tribal Mobilization Forces during a US bombing south of Mosul.

References 

Anti-ISIL factions in Iraq